The Medusa Nebula is a planetary nebula in the constellation of Gemini. It is also known as Abell 21 and Sharpless 2-274. It was originally discovered in 1955 by University of California, Los Angeles astronomer George O. Abell, who classified it as an old planetary nebula. Until the early 1970s, the nebula was thought to be a supernova remnant. With the computation of expansion velocities and the thermal character of the radio emission, Soviet astronomers in 1971 concluded that it was most likely a planetary nebula. As the nebula is so large, its surface brightness is very low, with surface magnitudes of between +15.99 and +25 reported.

The central star of the planetary nebula is an PG 1159 star.

See also
 Abell Catalog of Planetary Nebulae　　　　　　　　　　　
 Geminga, Gemini gamma-ray source
 Gemini in Chinese astronomy
 IC 444, reflection nebula
 Messier 35 open cluster
 Cancer Minor (constellation) - Obsolete constellation inside modern Gemini

References

External links
The Sharpless Catalog: Sharpless 274
APOD picture: The Medusa Nebula
Images of the Universe: PK 205+14.1 The Medusa Nebula in Gemini

Planetary nebulae
Gemini (constellation)
Sharpless objects
21
Astronomical objects discovered in 1955